
A number of signal boxes in England are on the Statutory List of Buildings of Special Architectural or Historic Interest. Signal boxes house the signalman and equipment that control the railway points and signals. Originally railway signals were controlled from a hut on a platform at junctions. In the 1850s a raised building with a glazed upper storey containing levers controlling points and signals was developed after John Saxby obtained a patent in 1856 for a mechanical system of interlocking the points and signals. Over half of the signalboxes before 1923 were built by private signalling contractors, the largest being Saxby & Farmer; Stevens & Sons, McKenzie & Holland, the Railway Signal Co., Dutton & Co and Evans, O’Donnell & Co were others. Some railway companies had a standard signalbox design, such as the London & North Western Railway, whereas others, such as the Great Eastern Railway had many different designs.

Listed buildings are given one of three grades: Grade I for buildings of exceptional interest, Grade II* for particularly important buildings of more than special interest and Grade II for buildings that are of special interest. In 1948 there were approximately 10,000 signal boxes; by 2012 this had reduced to about 500. National Rail has plans to concentrate control at twelve centres by 2040, decommissioning most of the remaining mechanical signal boxes by 2025. A joint Historic England and Network Rail project listed 26 signal boxes in July 2013.

Signal boxes and swing bridge cabins are listed Grade II, except for those noted as Grade II*.

Signal boxes

See also
Signal boxes that are listed buildings in Scotland

Notes and references

References

Sources

Further reading

External links

+